Nam Kliang is a district (amphoe) in the central part of Sisaket province, northeastern Thailand.

Geography
Neighboring districts are (from the north clockwise): Kanthararom, Non Khun, Benchalak, Si Rattana, Phayu, and Mueang Sisaket.

History
The minor district (king amphoe) was created on 7 January 1986, when the four tambons, Nam Kliang, La-o, Tong Pit, and Khoen, were split off from Kanthararom district. It was upgraded to a full district on 4 July 1994.

Administration
The district is divided into six sub-districts (tambons), which are further subdivided into 75 villages (mubans). There are no municipal (thesaban) areas. There are six tambon administrative organizations (TAO).

References

External links
amphoe.com (Thai)

Nam Kliang